Chenal is French for "channel". It can refer to:

People
Giuliana Chenal-Minuzzo (1931–2020), Italian alpine skier
Joël Chenal (born 1973), French alpine skier
Leo Chenal (born 2000), American football player
Marthe Chenal (1881–1947), French operatic soprano
Pierre Chenal (1904–1990), French director and screenwriter

Places
 Chenal, Louisiana, community in the United States
 Chenal Valley, Little Rock, Arkansas, United States
 Chenal Bari, village in Pariz District, Sirjan County, Kerman Province, Iran

See also
 Chenaux (disambiguation)
 Cheval (disambiguation)